Čierny (feminine: Čierna ) is a Slovak-language surname, the counterpart of the Czech surname Černý.

It may refer to:
Jozef Čierny, Slovak professional ice hockey player
Ladislav Čierny, Slovak professional ice hockey player

Slovak-language surnames